Edward Katongole-Mbidde, MBChB, MMed, MRCP (UK), is a physician, academic, and medical oncologist in Uganda. He is the immediate past executive director of Uganda Virus Research Institute.

See also
 Uganda Cancer Institute
 Makerere University School of Medicine

References

External links
Website of Uganda Virus Institute

Ugandan oncologists
Ganda people
Living people
People from Central Region, Uganda
Makerere University alumni
Academic staff of Makerere University
Year of birth missing (living people)